
Roztocze National Park is a national park in Lublin Voivodeship of southeastern Poland. It protects the most valuable natural areas of the middle part of the Roztocze range. The park has its headquarters in Zwierzyniec.

History
The history of this area is closely connected with the Zamoyski family estate, which was founded in 1589. The estate's headquarters were at Zwierzyniec.

The beginnings of nature protection in the region date to 1934, when the Bukowa Góra Preserve was created (now it is a strictly protected area). In 1938, for the first time in Poland, a bill was issued that stated that prey birds on the Zamoyski family estate were protected. The park was created from State Forests of the districts of Kosobudy and Zwierzyniec, which had belonged to the Zamoyski family estate.

The area of the park and adjacent lands witnessed numerous battles during the Polish January Uprising and both World Wars. Tragic reminiscences of these times are in cemeteries in Zwierzyniec and other locations.

Roztocze National Park was created in 1974 and initially covered area of 48.01 km2. The park's management is in the restored house of the former Zamoyski's estate administrator in Zwierzyniec.

Geography
The park is located in the picturesque Roztocze Środkowe region in the upper Wieprz river valley. These parts separate Lublin Upland (Polish: Wyżyna Lubelska) from Sandomierz Dale (Polish: Kotlina Sandomierska). The water of the main river running through the park — the Wieprz — is of the second class of purity. There are two streams that originate here: the Szum (2.5 km) and the Świerszcz (7.5 km).

Roztoczański National Park boasts unique tree formations. There are more than 400 ancient trees there referred to as "nature monuments" as well as some of the largest firs in all of in Poland (up to 50 meters high). Tourists have a choice of using five walking trails or a dedicated bicycle trail.

Wildlife
Among mammals living in the park are red deer, roe deer, boar, red fox, grey wolf, and eurasian badger. In 1979 European beavers were reintroduced and now colonies of the mammal thrive in the Wieprz valley. In 1982 Polish ponies were brought here.

There have been registered around 190 species of birds, including eagles, storks, and woodpeckers. Reptiles are represented by lizards, common European adders, and grass snakes as well as the endangered European pond terrapin. Insect fauna is interesting, with more than 2000 species.

Gallery

External links

 Official website

National parks of Poland
Parks in Lublin Voivodeship
Protected areas established in 1974
1974 establishments in Poland
Central European mixed forests